Wasserturm Wilhelmshaven (Wilhelmshaven Water Tower) is a 42 meters tall landmark of Wilhelmshaven in Lower Saxony, Germany. The tower was built in the years of 1910-11 as the third water tower of Wilhelmshaven, and still functions as an important part of the town's water supply. It was originally constructed with a suspended drinking water storage element consisting of two alloyed steel chambers. Both chambers could contain between 800 and 1200 cubic meters of water.

The water container was revamped in 2007 during a working period of several months, and the whole tower including the foundation was reconstructed. After 100 years of operation the technique of the tower was outdated. Corrosion damages resulted in leaks of the inner connections. The old container was completely demounted during the reconstruction, and a new one made of stainless steel with a diameter of 15.90 (water level 8.75 meters) was installed. The new container has a water capability of 1750 cubic meters.

Location
The tower is located in Kurpark at Bismarckstraße.

References

Towers completed in 1911
Water towers in Germany
Buildings and structures in Wilhelmshaven